Dolon may refer to:

Dolon (mythology), character in Greek mythology who spied for Troy during the Trojan War
Dolon (Δόλων), a women's cult-association at Cyzicus worshiping the goddess Artemis
Dolon (air base), air base in Semipalatinsk, Kazakhstan
Dolon, Issyk Kul, village in the Issyk Kul Province of Kyrgyzstan
Dolon Pass, mountain pass in Kyrgyzstan
Dolon Nor, town in Duolun County, Inner Mongolia, China
Duolun County, or Dolon, in Inner Mongolia, China
7815 Dolon, Jupiter Trojan
Dolon, an Ancient Roman type of swordstick